Blandinsville is a village in McDonough County, Illinois, United States. The population was 569 at the 2020 census, down from 651 in 2010.

History
The town is named for Joseph L. Blandin, owner of the first general store.  In 1842, the town was platted on a tract known as Job's Settlement, named after early settlers William and Ira Job.  A post office was established in 1843.  The Frank Hicks House in Blandinsville was constructed by architect George Franklin Barber in 1895.

Geography
Blandinsville is in northwestern McDonough County. Illinois Route 9 passes through the village as Washington Street, leading northwest  to La Harpe and east  to Bushnell.

The village sits on a low ridge bordered by Little Creek to the north and Baptist Creek to the south. Both are west-flowing tributaries of La Harpe Creek, a tributary of the La Moine River and part of the Illinois River watershed.

The town currently features on main street two bars on main street 2 Doors Down, and Slup's Bar and Grill, and a restaurant called Tink's cafe. There are active churches operating in the town. The town also features the Blandinsville Golf & Country golf course, and the Blandin House Museum.

Demographics

As of the census of 2000, there were 777 people, 339 households, and 224 families residing in the village. The racial makeup of the village was 98.71% White, 0.13% Asian, 0.51% from other races, and 0.64% from two or more races. Hispanic or Latino of any race were 0.77% of the population.

There were 339 households, out of which 28.9% had children under the age of 18 living with them, 54.0% were married couples living together, 7.4% had a female householder with no husband present, and 33.9% were non-families. 29.8% of all households were made up of individuals, and 18.0% had someone living alone who was 65 years of age or older. The average household size was 2.29 and the average family size was 2.83.

In the village, the population was spread out, with 22.3% under the age of 18, 8.4% from 18 to 24, 26.5% from 25 to 44, 23.9% from 45 to 64, and 18.9% who were 65 years of age or older. The median age was 41 years. For every 100 females, there were 101.3 males. For every 100 females age 18 and over, there were 98.0 males.

The median income for a household in the village was $30,272, and the median income for a family was $39,028. Males had a median income of $30,625 versus $19,479 for females. The per capita income for the village was $15,203. About 6.8% of families and 8.8% of the population were below the poverty line, including 6.2% of those under age 18 and 7.2% of those age 65 or over.

References

Villages in McDonough County, Illinois
Villages in Illinois